Le Gros Bras (English: The Big Arm) is a tributary of the eastern bank of the lower part of the rivière du Gouffre, flowing in the unorganized territory of Lac-Pikauba and the municipality of Saint-Urbain, in the Charlevoix Regional County Municipality, in the administrative region of Capitale-Nationale, in the province of Quebec, in Canada. The upper part of this watercourse begins in Grands-Jardins National Park.

This valley is mainly served by the route 138 whose segment near the Saint-Laurent river is designated boulevard Monseigneur de Laval; then consecutively going up north rue Saint-Édouard in Saint-Urbain, chemin Saint-François entering the forest zone, then "chemin du Parc-des-Grands-Jardins" further north. Forestry is the main economic activity in this valley; recreational tourism, second.

The surface of Le Gros Bras is generally frozen from the beginning of December until the beginning of April; however, safe circulation on the ice is generally done from mid-December to the end of March. The water level of the river varies with the seasons and the precipitation; the spring flood generally occurs in April.

Geography 
The Gros Bras rises at the confluence of two forest streams located in the forest zone and encased between Mont Jean-Palardy (located 0.5 km from the west side,) and another mountain (located 1.2 km from the northeast side,). This source of the river is located at:
  east of a curve of the course of the upper part of the Malbaie River;
  north-west of the village center of Saint-Urbain;
  north-west of the mouth of the Gros Bras (confluence with the Gouffre river);
  north-west of Baie-Saint-Paul town center.

  towards the south-east in a deep valley by collecting the discharge (coming from the south-west) of a small lake, until the discharge (coming from the north-east) of the Lake du Gros Ruisseau;
  towards the south-east in a deep valley, by collecting the discharge (coming from the north-east) of Lake Georges, then by forming a small loop towards the south-west, that is to say on the side north of a campsite in the park, and leaving Grands-Jardins National Park at the end of the segment and passing in front of the hamlet "Le Pied-des-Monts", up to a stream (coming from the north -Where is). Note: this confluence is very close to the eastern limit of the Laurentides Wildlife Reserve;
  towards the south-east in Saint-Urbain by collecting the discharge (coming from the west) of a small lake and by forming a loop towards the south-west where an exploitation is located mining, to the confluence of the Rivière des Monts (coming from the west);
  to the southeast by forming a small loop to the northeast, to Parent stream (coming from the west);
  towards the south-east by forming some isolated serpentines, in a deep valley, and by collecting the discharge (coming from the west) of a small lake, until the confluence of the Le Petit Bras (coming from the southwest);
  towards the south-east by crossing the route 381 and forming a loop towards the south, until its mouth.

The Gros Bras flows downstream from a river loop on the west bank of the Rivière du Gouffre, in the municipality of Saint-Urbain. This mouth is located at:
  upstream of the road bridge in the village of Saint-Urbain;
  north-west of the village center of Saint-Urbain;
  south-west of the village center of Saint-Hilarion;
  north-west of Baie-Saint-Paul town center;
  south-west of La Malbaie town center.

Toponymy 
This toponymic designation appeared for the first time on a map in 1870. This designation is always used by local informants. The name appears on the draft of the Saint-Urbain map, 1958-12-17, item 170. The toponymic variants are: Bras Nord-Ouest, Rivière à Yves and Rivière du Gros Bras.

The toponym "Le Gros Bras" was formalized on December 5, 1968 at the Place Names Bank of the Commission de toponymie du Québec.

Notes and references

Appendices

Related articles 
 Charlevoix Regional County Municipality
 Lac-Pikauba, an unorganized territory
 Saint-Urbain, a municipality
 Grands-Jardins National Park
 Bras Nord de la Rivière des Monts
 Rivière des Monts
 Le Petit Bras (Le Gros Bras)
 Rivière du Gouffre
 St. Lawrence River
 List of rivers of Quebec

External links 

Rivers of Capitale-Nationale
 Charlevoix Regional County Municipality